Thiago Carvalho de Oliveira (born 24 June 1988 in Rio Verde), known as  Thiago Carvalho, is a Brazilian football manager and former player who played as a central defender. He is the current manager of Caxias.

References

External links 
 Futebol de Goyaz player profile 
 Futebol de Goyaz manager profile 
 

1988 births
Living people
Sportspeople from Goiás
Brazilian footballers
Association football central defenders
Campeonato Brasileiro Série A players
Campeonato Brasileiro Série B players
Campeonato Brasileiro Série D players
Vila Nova Futebol Clube players
Trindade Atlético Clube players
América Futebol Clube (SP) players
Boa Esporte Clube players
Cruzeiro Esporte Clube players
Ceará Sporting Club players
Associação Atlética Aparecidense players
Brazilian football managers
Campeonato Brasileiro Série D managers
Associação Atlética Aparecidense managers
Sociedade Esportiva e Recreativa Caxias do Sul managers